Kristina Bröring-Sprehe (born 28 October 1986 in Lohne, West Germany) is a German dressage rider competing at Olympic level.

Career
On 7 August 2012 Sprehe was a member of the team which won the silver medal in the team dressage event.

She was a member of the German team that won the team Gold at the 2013 European Dressage Championship in Herning. At the 2014 World Equestrian Games in Normandy Kristina won another team Gold and individual Bronze in the Grand Prix Special, her first individual championship medal at the senior level. At the 2015 European Dressage Championships in Aachen, Kristina and her top horse of the past four years, Desperados, won team Bronze and two individual silver medals. She also won bronze in the individual dressage at the 2016 Summer Olympics.

References 

Living people
1986 births
German female equestrians
German dressage riders
Olympic equestrians of Germany
Equestrians at the 2012 Summer Olympics
Equestrians at the 2016 Summer Olympics
Olympic gold medalists for Germany
Olympic silver medalists for Germany
Olympic bronze medalists for Germany
Olympic medalists in equestrian
Medalists at the 2012 Summer Olympics
Medalists at the 2016 Summer Olympics
Sportspeople from Lower Saxony
People from Vechta (district)